The men's C-1 500 metres event was an open-style, individual canoeing event conducted as part of the Canoeing at the 1992 Summer Olympics program.

Medallists

Results

Heats
19 competitors were entered. The top three finishers in each heat moved on to the semifinals with the others were relegated to the repechages.

Repechages
Two repechages were held with the top four finishers in each repechage and the fastest fifth-place finisher advancing to the semifinals.

Semifinals
Two semifinals were held with the top four finishers of each semifinal and the fastest fifth-place finisher advancing to the final.

Final
The final took place on August 7.

Three-time event world champion Slyvynsky was upset by Bukhalov, who also beat him on the Olympic course at 1991. Jamieson originally finished eighth, but was disqualified for reasons not disclosed in the official report.

References
1992 Summer Olympics official report Volume 5. pp. 141–2. 
Sports-reference.com 1992 C-1 500 m results.
Wallechinsky, David and Jaime Loucky (2008). "Canoeing: Men's Canadian Singles 500 Meters". In The Complete Book of the Olympics: 2008 Edition. London: Aurum Press Limited. p. 479.

Men's C-1 500
Men's events at the 1992 Summer Olympics